This is a list of heritage places in the City of Fremantle that are listed on the State Register of Heritage Places.  In 2017, there are 252 such places, including buildings and monuments.  This list includes many places which are included within the Fremantle West End Heritage area, a historic district which includes about 250 buildings, which was itself listed on the State Register in 2016.

This list is based on information from the State Heritage Office's inHerit database. The inHerit database includes places which are on the State Register of Heritage Places, the City of Fremantle's Municipal Heritage Inventory, the National Trust's List of Classified Places, the National Heritage List and the Commonwealth Heritage List. This list contains just those listed on the State Register.

Locations are approximate, and may be viewed in linked OSM, Google, or Bing maps.  Coordinates are intended to be pointed to exact buildings and monuments listed, but have not all been verified, and may be off by 50 metres or more.

List

See also
Fremantle West End Heritage area

Notes

References

Fremantle
Fremantle
 
Fremantle-related lists